Club Balonmano La Calzada, also known as Motive.co Gijón for sponsorship reasons, is a women's handball team based in Gijón, Asturias which currently plays in División de Honor Femenina de Balonmano, the top tier in the Spanish league system.

History
BM La Calzada was founded on 18 October 1995 after the merge of local teams Club Balonmano Riscar and Asociación Deportiva Balonmano La Calzada.

In 2016, the club promoted for the first time to División de Honor and in 2018, the club won its first Copa de la Reina.

Season by season

Trophies
 Copa de la Reina: (1)
 2017–18

Current squad
Squad for the 2022–23 season

Goalkeepers
 1  Raquel Álvarez Lafuente
 33  Lucía Alonso Fernández
Wingers
RW
 8  Paula Valdivia Monserrat
 31  Sandra Vallina Guerra
LW
 10  María González Martínez
 20  Lucía Laguna Aranda
Line players
 13  María Palomo Pineda
 47  Nayla de Andrés Castillo

Back players
LB
 14  Debora Torreira Ortiz
 23  Mina Novović 
 25  Lucia Fernandez Nieto
 70  Carmen Arroyo Pimienta
CB
 9  Marizza Faría
 11  Cecilia Cacheda
RB
 6  Lorena Zarco
 96  Joana Da Costa Fortuna

Notable players 
  Rocío Campigli
  Fernanda Insfrán

References

External links
Official website 

Sport in Gijón
Handball clubs established in 1995
Spanish handball clubs
1995 establishments in Spain
Sports teams in Asturias